By the People may refer to:

 A Gettysburg Address phrase: "government of the people, by the people, for the people"
 By the People (2005 film), a Malayalam movie sequel to the film 4 the People
 By the People: The Election of Barack Obama, a 2009 documentary on the election on Barack Obama to the presidency of the United States